Rattle Records, established in 1991, is a contemporary art-music label based in Auckland, New Zealand. It releases compositions generally by New Zealand composers in contemporary art genres. It has been described as "the de facto home of New Zealand music that didn't fit the three-minute pop song format"

History
Rattle Records as a label and a studio was established by Steve Garden, Tim Gummer and Keith Hill in 1991 to publish music 'outside of the usual commercial musical imperatives'. They used the German label ECM Records as an inspiration. Rattle was owned by Victoria University of Wellington's publishing division for a time and when that ended Steve Garden took over again.

There have been over 150 releases and over 44 award nominations. In the Aotearoa Music Awards 2020 all three finalists in the Best Classical Artist category were Rattle recordings with 11 Frames by Andrew Beer & Sarah Watkins winning.

Artists
Rattle has represented over 100 different artists since its inception including:

 Whirimako Black
 Jonathan Besser
 Jack Body
 Chris Gendall
 Michael Houstoun
 Diedre Irons
 Natalia Mann
 Hirini Melbourne
 Jian Liu
 Sam Leamy
 Jenny McLeod
 NZ Guitar Quartet
 Nga Tae
 Keith Price
 Richard Nunns 
 John Psathas
 Jenny Wollerman 
 Sounddome
 Eve de Castro-Robinson, 
 Roger Fox 
 Gillian Whitehead 
 Te Koki Trio
 Ariana Tikao

See also 
 List of record labels
 Music of New Zealand

External links
Rattle Records website
Directory

References

Sources
 Audio Culture, The noisy library of New Zealand music. Sourced 21 March 2020.
 NZ Musician, a print and online music magazine that deals with music in and from New Zealand.

New Zealand record labels
Record labels established in 1991